This is a list of the television stations in Samoa.

TV1Samoa talanoa lakapi 

Since the privatisation of the state owned Samoa Broadcasting Corporation in 2008, TV1 is the new television station under the Samoa Quality Broadcasting Limited company has leased the previous FM frequency (89.1FM) & the UHF frequency and facilities of the former SBC studios at Mulinu'u. The shareholders of the newly formed company consist of a few old staff members of the former SBC with Galumalemana Faiasea Matafeo as the Chief Executive Officer.’

It continues to offer SBC’s former services such as Tala Fou (News), Lali (National Magazine show), Starsearch (Singing competition), Vaa o Manu (Religious discussion panel) & Faleula o Samoa (Samoan cultural discussion panel). TV1 also carries TVNZ News and live sports feeds.

EFKS-TV
Commenced broadcasting in May 2013, owned and operated by The Congregational Christian Church of Samoa, on channels 10 & 11 above Apia. New transmitters have been added on Savaii. Operates as a conventional commercial station, but no advertising on Sundays. Carries TVNZ News at 1pm and 9pm.

Samoa Television and Radio 

Samoa’s only 24-hour television station began its operations from the former Lau TV studios on March 9, 2009. The station closed in 2011.

TV3
The Keil family privately owned TV station established its presence in the air in May 2006 and is part of the Apia Broadcasting Corporation.’

Its renowned programmes are TV3 News which has Samoa’s only outside live broadcasting facilities which can broadcast news live from any remote location in Samoa as with other international news agencies. TV3 has often been a reliable service provider to overseas media agencies who require a satellite feed for news footage from Samoa.

Other programmes include Manuo (magazine show) and SamoaTel's Showtime (singing competition).
The station operates from 6am to 12pm and is received by 90% of Samoan households.

VBTV

VBTV Previously (Vaiala Beach Television) is now operated as a Catholic station broadcasting EWTN, the Catholic TV satellite channel.

CGTN (CCTV-9)

China's state-run broadcaster, China Global Television Network (China Central Television 9), relays its content on Samoa's free to air ultra-high frequency. It carries international and Chinese programmes that are in the English language. It debuted in Samoa in 2005. The retransmission is part of a deal struck with (then) SBC-TV in return for the supply of some satellite reception and transmission equipment to SBC-TV by China.

Ceased television stations

Samoa Broadcasting Corporation (SBC)
SBC was Samoa's public television and radio broadcaster created by an act of Parliament in 2003, replacing the old Western Samoa Broadcasting Department. This government entity include both the former Televise Samoa (established in 1993) & Radio 2AP (established in 1929).

It was then privatised by the Samoan government in late 2008 with the exception of the AM station, Radio 2AP.

One of its biggest projects it carried out in its short life-span as SBC has been the international television coverage broadcast in cooperation with TVNZ Pacific News Service, Maori TV & TV3 Samoa of the late Royal Highness, Malietoa Tanumafili II's State Funeral as well as the South Pacific Games first live broadcast coverage in Apia 2007.

O Lau TV
A new Samoan free to air TV station established and first went on air in early 2006. It ceased operation in October 2007. The channels (10 and 11) are now used by EFKS-TV, a commercial channel operated by The Congregational Christian Church of Samoa.

References

Stations
Television
Samoa